The Wilhelmshaven Power Station is one of two coal power stations in the city of Wilhelmshaven, Germany. Built in the middle of the 1970s, the power station has an output of 747 megawatts.

External links 

Coal-fired power stations in Germany
Buildings and structures in Wilhelmshaven
Economy of Lower Saxony
Uniper